The Exchequer Court (Scotland) Act 1707 (6 Ann c 53) is an Act of the Parliament of Great Britain.

This Act was partly in force in Great Britain at the end of 2010.

Sections 2 to 6, 8 to 10 and 14 to 32 were repealed by Schedule 1 to the Statute Law Revision Act 1948.

References

External links
The Exchequer Court (Scotland) Act 1707, as amended, from Legislation.gov.uk.

Great Britain Acts of Parliament 1707